The Approval Voting Party (AVP) is a single-issue American political party dedicated to implementing approval voting in the United States. In 2019, the party became recognized as a minor party in Colorado.

History

The Approval Voting Party was co-founded by Blake Huber and Frank Atwood. The party ran Huber for the position of Colorado Secretary of State in 2018. Huber received 13,258 votes, 0.5 percent of all cast, behind the Democratic, Republican, and Constitution Party nominees.

In October 2019, the party received minor party status in Colorado after surpassing 1,000 registered members.

In 2019, Atwood, a member of the Littleton, Colorado election commission, attempted to pass a measure that would have implemented approval voting in non-partisan municipal elections within that town. The election commission voted to send the measure to the city council; however, the city council voted 4-3 against the measure.

Presidential elections

2016 presidential campaign
During the 2016 presidential election, Frank Atwood served as the AVP's presidential nominee and Blake Huber as its vice-presidential nominee. Atwood and Huber only appeared on the ballot in Colorado, receiving 337 votes.

2020 presidential campaign
On March 8, 2020, four delegates voted to give Huber the presidential nomination and Atwood the vice-presidential nomination at a meeting in Sheridan, Colorado. Huber and Atwood were on the ballot in Vermont and Colorado.

References

Approval voting
Political parties in Colorado
Political parties in the United States
Single-issue political parties